The 2021 Stanford Cardinal men's soccer team represented Stanford University during the 2021 NCAA Division I men's soccer season. They were led by tenth year head coach Jeremy Gunn.

Previous season
The Cardinal played their 2020 season in early 2021 due to Covid-19. They finished conference play at 7–2–1, 1st place in the Pac-12 season and 10–3–1 overall. The Cardinal would win their second round match-up in the 2020 NCAA Tournament against Omaha in overtime, but would lose in the third round to North Carolina 0–1.

Preseason Media polls

Source:

Roster 
Source:

Schedule

|-
!colspan=6 style=""| Exhibition

|-
!colspan=6 style=""| Regular season

2022 MLS Super Draft

Source:

Rankings

References

2021
Stanford Cardinal
Stanford Cardinal
Stanford Cardinal men's soccer